The 1979 Copa Libertadores represented the 20th edition of the tournament, which saw Olimpia of Paraguay win the title for the first time, the first time a team from a country outside Uruguay, Argentina or Brazil won the tournament. This allowed the Paraguayan side to play the Intercontinental Cup against Malmö FF of Sweden, in which the South American side won.

Qualified teams
 Argentina
Boca Juniors	(1978 Libertadores Champion)
Independiente	(Champion of Campeonato Nacional Argentino 1978)
Quilmes	(Champion of Campeonato Metropolitano Argentino 1978)
 Bolivia
Bolívar	(Champion of Campeonato Boliviano 1978)
Jorge Wilsterman (Runners-up of Campeonato Boliviano 1978)
 Brazil
Guarani	(Champion of Campeonato Brasileiro 1978)
Palmeiras (Runners-up of Campeonato Brasileiro 1978)
 Chile
Palestino (Champion of Campeonato Chileno 1978)
O’Higgins (Winner Liga Pre-Libertadores 1978)
 Colombia
Millonarios  (Champion of 1978 Campeonato Profesional)
Deportivo Cali (Runners-up of 1978 Campeonato Profesional)
 Ecuador
El Nacional	(Champion of Campeonato Ecuatoriano 1978)
Técnico Universitario	(Runners-up of Campeonato Ecuatoriano 1978)
 Paraguay
Olimpia (Champion of Campeonato Paraguayo 1978)
Sol de América (Runners-up of Campeonato Paraguayo 1978)
 Peru
Alianza Lima (Champion of Campeonato Peruano 1978)
Universitario (Runners-up of  Campeonato Peruano 1978)
 Uruguay
Peñarol (Champion of Liga Pre-Libertadores 1978)
Nacional (Runners-up of Liga Pré-Libertadores 1978)
 Venezuela
Portuguesa	(Champion of Campeonato Venezuelano 1978)
Galicia (Runners-up of Campeonato Venezuelano 1978)

Group stage
Boca Juniors, of Argentina skips to semifinals as current champions.

Group 1

Group 2

Group 3

Group 4

Group 5

Semifinals

Group A

Group B

Finals

Champion

Top-scorers
6 goles
 Juan José Oré (Universitario)
 Miltäo (Guaraní)

External links
 Sitio oficial de la CONMEBOL
 Libertadores 1979 at RSSSF.com

1
Copa Libertadores seasons